Emmanuel Ntima Weyi is a Congolese entrepreneur and former presidential candidate for the Democratic Republic of Congo. He served as the co-founder and Chief Executive Officer of Groupe Weyi International  – a sustainable mining enterprise focused on the Congo from 2009-2014.

Education 
Weyi was born in Kisangani on May 29, 1959, and grew up in a family with 2 brothers and 7 sisters. In 1960, Weyi's family moved to the capital of Kinshasa, where his father would become the head of the Union Zaroise de Banques in 1971. That same year, Weyi completed his completed his elementary schooling at a Catholic school.

In 1972, at the behest of his father, Weyi went back to the Bas-Congo to attend a Catholic boarding school for secondary education. After graduating high school in 1979, he attended the Ecole Internationale Des Hautes Etudes in Paris to study International Relations.

Career 
After moving to the US, Weyi attended an English language school, where he learned how to speak and write English, adding to his fluency in French, Lingala, Swahili and Kikongo. In 2003, focusing on business in Congo, he started Groupe Weyi, an enterprise focused on sustainable mining in the DRC. In 2011, it expanded to Kinshasa, DRC. Weyi has been defrauding American citizens since his "run" for president of Congo, which he used to get money for his personal expenses. He is protected by Wikipedia editors, but his true story can be found online. He stole hundreds of thousands of dollars from his former partner Chuck Blakeman. He has not been in the US since 2016. He is homeless. He has been moving from rented room to rented room in Kampala, Uganda, where he often does not pay his rent.

Presidential campaign 
In 2011, Weyi participated in a congress to decide on one candidate to represent the diaspora in the upcoming election of that year. And in 2015, he announced that he would plan to run for president in the 2016 elections when current incumbent Joseph Kabila completed his second and last term in office as mandated by the DRC's constitution. After multiple years-long delays from then-president Kabila, he withdrew his candidacy, with Felix Tshisekedi eventually announced the winner—amid more controversy —in 2019.

References

External links 
  (Campaign)

1959 births
Democratic Republic of the Congo politicians
Living people
People from Kisangani
21st-century Democratic Republic of the Congo people